Fusion Core Drum and Bugle Corps is an all-age drum and bugle corps from Morris County, New Jersey. The corps is a member of Drum Corps Associates (DCA), and  compete in Open Class.

About 
Founded in 2006, the corps' first competitive year 2007. The founding director, Holly Marino, said the corps began as a "group of best friends." Fusion's mission is to "provide young adults with an educational program of the highest quality" so they may continue to their music education within a "balanced environment." The corps accepts members of all ages.

In 2010, Fusion won Class A championships. Two years later, the corps was advance to Open class.

The corps has graduated over 1,013 alumni since its founding, and has been recognized as a DCA World Championship finalist ten times since 2008.

Show Summary (2007–present) 
Source:

Gold indicates DCA Championship; blue background indicates DCA class finalist.

References

External links 
 
 

2006 establishments in New Jersey